Neilston railway station is a railway station in the village of Neilston, East Renfrewshire, Greater Glasgow, Scotland.

History 
The station was originally opened as part of the Lanarkshire and Ayrshire Railway on 1 May 1903. It closed between 1 January 1917 and 2 March 1919 due to wartime economy, and upon the grouping of the L&AR into the London, Midland and Scottish Railway in 1923, the station was renamed Neilston High on 2 June 1924. It was renamed back to Neilston on 6 May 1974 by British Rail.

The station is fully operational today as the terminal station on the Glasgow Central – Neilston line. The railway was electrified in May 1962 (using overhead wires supplying 25 kV A.C) and Class 303 "Blue Train" electric multiple units provided almost all trains services for many years thereafter, being joined by the similar Class 311 from 1967. Following withdrawal of the Class 303 and 311, Class 314 were the mainstay of the service until their withdrawal in 2019, with occasional services operated by Class 318, Class 334 and Class 320. As of 2022 train services are operated by Class 318, Class 320, Class 380 and Class 385

The line previously continued southwest to Uplawmoor, but this section closed to passengers in April 1962 and to all traffic in December 1964.

Layout and facilities

Although the station is a terminus, it has kept a conventional two platform layout with separate tracks for arrivals & departures.  The two lines merge into a single reversing siding immediately west of the station (on the course of the old L&AR line to Uplawmoor) and terminating trains use this to change platforms before returning east to Glasgow.  It is a staffed station, with step-free access to each platform via ramps (although these are quite steep) and a roadbridge at the eastern end linking the two. A P.A system and passenger information screens provide train running information.

Services

2016 
There is a daily half-hourly service from Neilston to  via Queens Park. The typical journey time is 27 minutes.

References

Notes

Sources

External links

Video footage of Neilston Railway Station

Railway stations in East Renfrewshire
Former Caledonian Railway stations
Railway stations in Great Britain opened in 1903
Railway stations in Great Britain closed in 1917
Railway stations in Great Britain opened in 1919
Railway stations served by ScotRail
Neilston